Stanisław Józef Żółtek (born 7 May 1956) is a Polish politician who is the current leader of the Congress of the New Right. He was a Member of the European Parliament representing Lesser Poland and Świętokrzyskie.
He was a candidate for president of Poland in the 2020 Polish presidential election.

References

1956 births
Living people
MEPs for Poland 2014–2019
Congress of the New Right politicians
Politicians from Kraków
Candidates in the 2020 Polish presidential election